Luka Nioradze is a Georgian rugby union player who plays as a hooker for Aurillac and also plays internationally for Georgia as a Hooker.

References

1998 births
Living people
Rugby union players from Georgia (country)
Rugby union props
Rugby union players from Tbilisi